Whitney Peak may refer to:
 Whitney Peak (Antarctica), a peak in Marie Byrd Land, Antarctica
 Whitney Peak (actress), Ugandan actress